José Santos Guardiola Bustillo (1 November 1816 in Tegucigalpa, Honduras – 11 January 1862 in Comayagua, Honduras) was a two-term President of Honduras from 17 February 1856 to 7 February 1860 and from 7 February 1860 to his death on 11 January 1862, when he became the only President of Honduras to be assassinated while in office in a crime committed by his personal guard.

His parents were the Catalan miner Esteban Guardiola and Bibiana Bustillo. He married Ana de Arzibu and one of their many daughters, Genoveva Guardiola Arbizú, married the first President of the Republic of Cuba, Tomás Estrada Palma.

For his first term, he was elected president by Congress after the overthrow of Trinidad Cabañas. His second term came through the way of free elections in which he won easily. His administration was one of the most liberal in Honduran history, in spite of him belonging to the Conservative Party. His government granted freedom of press, suffrage and movement; it respected and it guaranteed the individual freedom and it regularized the relations between the church and the State. He opposed Francisco Morazán in the conflict over whether to have a Central American state.

His good relations with the British helped facilitate the return of governance of the Bay Islands and the La Mosquitia region into Honduras. He struck a deal with Queen Victoria on which Great Britain recognized the Honduran sovereignty of the aforementioned territories (the treaty of Wyke-Cruz) as long as the inhabitants of the islands were granted freedom of worship. For this the Vicar of Comayagua, Miguel del Cid, enemy of General Guardiola, excommunicated him, but Pope Pius IX overturned it and named Juan de Jesus Zepeda Zepeda as Bishop of Honduras. He fought against William Walker, who organized several private military expeditions into Mexico and Central America with the intention of re-establishing slavery and taking over all of Central America.

Composer Guadalupe Haertling was among Guardiola's descendants.

References

1816 births
1862 deaths
People from Tegucigalpa
Honduran people of Catalan descent
Conservative Party of Honduras politicians
Presidents of Honduras
Assassinated heads of state
Assassinated Honduran politicians
People murdered in Honduras
Assassinated heads of government